The 1981 NAIA Soccer Championship was the 23rd annual tournament held by the NAIA to determine the national champion of men's college soccer among its members in the United States and Canada.

Four-time defending champions Quincy (IL) defeated Alderson Broaddus in the final, 4–1, to claim the Hawks' record eleventh NAIA national title.

The final was again played at Sangamon State University in Springfield, Illinois.

Qualification

The tournament field expanded for the second time in three years, increasing from ten to twelve teams. 

There was a significant change in tournament format this season. The previous single-elimination tournament, with additional consolation bracket, was dropped in favor of a two-round system consisting of an initial round of pool play, with twelve teams sorted into three groups for round-robin play, followed by a four-team single-elimination tournament, with additional third-place final, of the four teams that won each of the initial groups. The total number of matches, however, increased only from fifteen to sixteen.

First round

Pool A

Pool B

Pool C

Pool D

Knock out round

Bracket

See also  
 1981 NCAA Division I Soccer Tournament
 1981 NCAA Division II Soccer Championship
 1981 NCAA Division III Soccer Championship

References 

NAIA championships
NAIA
1981 in sports in Illinois